Chochół, Chochoł or Chochol may refer to:
Chochół, Masovian Voivodeship, village in Poland
Chochół, Warmian-Masurian Voivodeship, village in Poland
Josef Chochol, Czech architect
Chochoł (fictional character)
, Poland

See also
 
Khokhol, a Russian term for a hairstyle characteristic of Cossacks